Antonio Donnell Armstrong (born Antonio Donnell Shorter; October 15, 1973  July 29, 2016) was an American football linebacker who played professionally in the National Football League and the Canadian Football League.

High school and college
Armstrong started at Kashmere High School and signed with nearby Texas A&M. As a junior at A&M, Armstrong earned Defensive Player of the Game honors after making eight tackles and three sacks in the 1994 Cotton Bowl Classic against Notre Dame. Armstrong earned AP All-America honors his senior year (1994) after making 62 tackles, including 17 behind the line of scrimmage as a senior. He was a semifinalist for the Butkus Award that year, and was a two-time All-SWC selection.

Professional career

National Football League
Armstrong was drafted in the sixth round of the 1995 NFL Draft by the San Francisco 49ers, but fractured his ankle on the third day of training camp and was signed to the practice squad. He was released from the practice squad on October 15, 1995. On October 16, he was signed to the Miami Dolphins' practice squad and placed on the active roster a week later. Armstrong appeared in four games that season for the Dolphins and recorded four solo tackles. He was signed by the St. Louis Rams the following year, but was released after training camp.

Canadian Football League
Armstrong signed with the British Columbia Lions of the Canadian Football League in 1998 and made an immediate impact as a starter for two seasons with the team. In 2000, Armstrong was traded to the Winnipeg Blue Bombers. He was Winnipeg's defensive player of the year and an East Division All-star in 2000. On October 15, 2000, Armstrong suffered a career ending fracture of his left ankle. He attempted to return to the NFL, but was limited because of his injury.  Armstrong eventually re-signed with the Bombers in September 2001 and started the 2001 Grey Cup game. Armstrong decided to retire in 2002 because of a contract dispute and physical limitations due to his injury suffered in 2000.

Death
Armstrong was shot along with his wife, Dawn Armstrong in Houston, Texas, on July 29, 2016. Dawn was pronounced dead at the scene in her bedroom. Antonio was transported to Memorial Hermann in critical condition and later died. Their 16-year-old son AJ (Antonio Armstrong, Jr.) was charged with murder.

The murder trial of AJ started on April 2, 2019, where he was tried as an adult and faced life in prison if found guilty. The initial double-murder trial ended in a mistrial on Friday, April 26, 2019, when jurors failed to reach a unanimous decision in the capital murder case. A second trial for Armstrong was originally set to begin on Friday, October 4 but was postponed to Monday, January 6 due to court backlog. On Friday, January 2, 2020, the trial was postponed yet again after more than 30 motions were filed in the case.

References

External links
 A&M All-Americans
 Dolphins sign Armstrong
 BC Lions
 BC Trade

1973 births
2016 deaths
American football linebackers
African-American sportsmen
American players of Canadian football
BC Lions players
Canadian football linebackers
Miami Dolphins players
Players of American football from Houston
Players of Canadian football from Houston
Texas A&M Aggies football players
Winnipeg Blue Bombers players
Deaths by firearm in Texas
People murdered in Texas
Male murder victims
Murdered African-American people
Patricides
20th-century African-American sportspeople
21st-century African-American sportspeople